Pradosha or Pradosham (IAST: Pradoṣa) is a bimonthly occasion on the thirteenth day of every fortnight in the Hindu calendar. It is closely connected with the worship of the Hindu god Shiva.  The auspicious three-hour period 1.5 hours before and after sunset is considered as the most suited and optimal time for worship of Shiva on this day. The fasting vow performed during the period is called "Pradosha vrata". A devotee should wear rudraksha, Vibhuti and worship Shiva by abhisheka, sandal paste, bael leaves, fragrance, deepa and naivedya (food offerings).

Etymology
Pradosha is indicative of day names in the calendar. Pradosha was the son of Kalpa and Dosha. He had two brothers, namely Nishita and Vyustha. The three names mean beginning, middle and end of night. The days from every new moon day to every  full moon day is called "Shukla Paksha" and the days from every full moon day to new moon day is called "Krishna Paksha". During every month and during every paksha, the point of time when Thrayodashi (the 13th day of the lunar fortnight) meets the end of Dwadashi (the 12th day of the lunar fortnight) is called Pradosha.

Legend
The devas (celestial deities) approached Shiva in the most propitious moments of pradosha to get relief from the asuras - Danavas and Daityas.  They ran around Kailasha, Shiva's abode hitherto on a Thrayodashi evening and were aided by Nandi, Shiva's sacred bull. Shiva aided them in killing the asuras, which is why the practise of worshipping Shiva on Thrayodashi along with Nandi emerged and continues in Shiva temples.

Observances 

Pradosha vrata (vow) is performed on pradosha with sacred ritual steps following the tradition. During pradosha, the bull Nandi in all the Shiva temples in South India is worshipped. The festival idol of Shiva with his consort Parvati in a seated pose on Nandi is taken as a procession in the temple complex.

The Pradosha worship is done in the evening twilight or sandhya kala. The performance of the vrata involves a fast followed by a vigil. A bath is taken one hour before sunset and the deities Shiva, Parvati, their sons Ganesha and Kartikeya, and Nandi are worshipped. Following this, Shiva is invoked. The Pradosha story is read out after the formal worship is concluded.

Types 
Shani Pradosha is the pradosha falling on a Saturday, while Soma Pradosha is the pradosha on a Monday.

Maha Pradosha is the Pradosha which falls before or on Maha Shivaratri in the Hindu month of Maagha.

Shani Pradosha
Shani Pradosha, the pradosha falling on a Saturday corresponding to the planet Saturn, is considered important among other pradosham.  The importance of Shani Pradosha is closely associated with Mahakaleshwar temple in Ujjain, a town in the central Indian state of Madhya Pradesh.  The city of Ujjain was called Avantika and was famous for its devotional epicenter. It was also one of the primary cities where students went to study holy scriptures.

According to legend, there was a ruler of Ujjain called Chandrasena, who was a pious devotee of Shiva and worshipped him all the time. He was blessed with a celestial gem which could create miracles. Rivals of Ujjain, king Ripudaman and king Singhaditya of the neighboring kingdoms, decided to attack Ujjain and take over the treasure. The king Chandrasena, who was unaware of the impending war, was worshipping Shiva.  He was joined by a farmer's boy named Shrikhar, who was walking on the grounds of the palace and heard the king chant Shiva's name. However, the guards removed him by force and sent him to the outskirts of the city near the river Kshipra.  Shrikhar continued to pray, and the news spread to a priest named Vridhi. He was shocked to hear this, and upon the urgent pleas of his sons, he started to pray Shiva inside the river Kshipra. The enemy kings chose to attack, and it happened to be a Saturday and Triyodashi. With the help of the powerful demon Dushan, who was blessed by Brahma to be invisible, they plundered the city and attacked all the devotees of Shiva.
Upon hearing the pleas of his helpless devotees, Shiva appeared in his Mahakala (form of light) and destroyed the enemies of king Chandrasena. Upon the request of his devotees Shrikhar and Vridhi, Shiva agreed to reside in the city and become the chief deity of the kingdom. From that day on, Shiva resided in his light form as Mahakal in a Lingam that was formed on its own from the powers of the Shiva and his consort, Parvati. It is believed that people worshipping Shiva on a Shani Pradosha will be free from the fear of death and diseases. They would also be granted worldly treasures.

Notes

References

 
 
 
.
 .
 .

External links

 Speaking tree blog

Hindu rituals
Hindu calendar